William Thomas Franklin (born October 19, 1949) is a retired professional basketball power forward who spent three seasons in the American Basketball Association (ABA) as a member of the Virginia Squires (1972–73) and the San Antonio Spurs (1974–76).

Born in Norfolk, Virginia, he graduated from Purdue University where he played for George King, leading the Boilermakers to 3 consecutive Top 5 finishes in the Big Ten and a total record of 48–25 (overall) and 28–14 (conf).  He twice averaged a 'double-double,' leading the Boilermakers to the 1971 NIT tourney.  He finished his collegiate career with 851 points (#18 on the career list, today's #59) and 630 rebounds (#6 on the career list, today #18) He was a seventh round draft pick in the 1972 NBA draft by the Golden State Warriors; he was also drafted by his hometown Virginia Squires of the ABA.

References

External links

1949 births
Living people
American men's basketball players
Basketball players from Norfolk, Virginia
Golden State Warriors draft picks
Power forwards (basketball)
Purdue Boilermakers men's basketball players
San Antonio Spurs players
Virginia Squires players